Ramba is a village and township in the Tibet Autonomous Region of China. It is located 107 kilometres south of Lhasa in Rinbung County, Shigatse Prefecture. There is also a lake, Ramba Co in the area.

See also
List of towns and villages in Tibet

Populated places in Shigatse
Township-level divisions of Tibet